Morten Qvale (born 25 September 1957 in Drøbak) is a Norwegian fashion, commercial and art photographer. He has been shooting professionally since 1986. He lives and works in the Oslo area.

Career
In 1982 Qvale bought his first camera, and in 1983 he initiated , Norway's first international fashion magazine. As the editor-in-chief at Tique, Qvale had the opportunity to learn from experienced fashion photographers such as Guy Bourdin, Bill King, Terence Donovan and Knut Bry. He soon began creating his own photographs.

In order to pursue his career in photography, Qvale left Tique and moved on to shooting international campaigns for clients such as Oscar de la Renta, Jordache, Adidas, H&M, Reebok and editorial clients such as Vanity Fair, Elle International, L'officiel, and Schön. Celebrities, such as Claudia Schiffer, Helena Christensen, Anna Nicole Smith, Dita Von Teese, Donald Sutherland and Calvin Klein, are among the people he has photographed. He has also directed several commercials for Adidas, Synsam, Garnier, Kristian Aadnevik, and music videos for Tone Damli, Lars Jones, Sichelle, and Elisabeth Andreassen.

Qvale is one of Hasselblad's featured users.

Qvale had his first solo exhibition with Shot in a tent during the Norwegian International Film Festival in 2000. The exhibition showcased 30 celebrity photographs he had captured during the 1999 festival. It was also exhibited at the Norwegian Film Institute in Oslo in 2000. In 2005 and 2007 Qvale had two separate solo exhibitions at Kunsthuset gallery. In 2012 he participated in the group exhibition Motefotografi - Tradisjon og nyskapning at Preus Museum. His photography of both landscapes and nudes is sold to art collectors world wide, mainly through his gallery, Qvale Galleri.

In 2013 Qvale opened the Qvale Galleri in Oslo, where he in 2014 opened an exhibition with the photographer Albert Watson.

References

External links
 Qvale Galleri

Photographers from Oslo
1957 births
Living people
People from Frogn